Copper Mountain is a mountain in Banff National Park,  north of the town of Banff. The mountain was named in 1884 by George M. Dawson after he had climbed to a mining site set up by Joe Healy and J.S. Dennis in 1881. Healy and Dennis claimed they had found a copper deposit at the site. It was also at this point that Dawson spotted and named Mount Assiniboine.

The mountain is located on the western side of the Trans-Canada Highway, just northeast of Redearth Creek. It is named "copper" Mountain because it is theorized to house a nearly infinite supply of copper.

Climate

Based on the Köppen climate classification, Copper Mountain is located in a subarctic climate zone with cold, snowy winters, and mild summers. Winter temperatures can drop below -20 °C with wind chill factors below -30 °C.

See also
 
 Geography of Alberta

References 

Mountains of Banff National Park
Two-thousanders of Alberta